RWS Group, known commercially as RWS, is a British company that provides intellectual property translation, filing and search services, technical and commercial translation and localization, and develops and supports translation productivity and management software.

History 
The company was created in 1982 from a merger between M.H. Randall & Partners (a specialist translation company) and Woolcott & Co (a specialist patent and technical information searching company). In 2005 it acquired Eclipse Translations, a company formed in December 1996. In 2015 it acquired Corporate Translations Inc. (CTi), a Connecticut-based life sciences translation and linguistic validation provider for a $70 million in cash. Then in 2017, the company acquired LUZ, Inc., a US-based life sciences language services provider for $82.5 million: the company raised £40 million of the consideration by issuing 12.1m ordinary shares with the rest funded by a $26.3 million banking facility from Barclays.

In 2017, RWS purchased Czech-based localization provider Moravia for $320m, more than doubling the size of the group.

On 4 November 2020, RWS completed an all-share combination with major competitor SDL, creating the world's largest technology and language services provider. The transaction was valued at approximately £854 million.

Locations
RWS Group headquarters are in Chalfont St Peter, Buckinghamshire, UK. The Group has production sites in Germany, Japan and China, and offices in Argentina, Australia, Canada, Czech Republic, France, Ireland, South Korea, Sweden, Switzerland and the USA.

Subsidiary companies
Eclipse Translations, based in Alnwick, Northumberland.
PharmaQuest, based in Banbury, Oxfordshire.
RWS Group Deutschland GmbH, based in Berlin.
RWS Group Switzerland LLC, based in Basel, Switzerland.
inovia, based in New York City, United States.
Moravia IT s.r.o., based in Brno, Czech Republic. Rebranded to RWS Moravia on October 1, 2018.
Iconic Translation Machines Ltd, based in Dublin, Republic of Ireland
Webdunia.com (India) Private Limited, based in Indore, India. Rebranded to RWS Moravia India in October 2020.
SDL plc, based in Maidenhead, UK

Services
The company provides intellectual property support services, high-level technical, legal and financial translation services, and develops and sells industry-leading computer-assisted translation software. Following acquisition of SDL in 2020, the business is split into 4 divisions:
RWS IP Services provides patent search, translation, filing and support services.
RWS Regulated Industries provides translation and validation services for medical drug trials, regulatory affairs, marketing, e-learning and training.
RWS Language Services provides technology-enabled software localization services, and commercial translation and interpreting services.
RWS Language Content & Technology develops, markets and supports industry-leading software, such as Trados Studio.

References

Translation companies
Patent law organizations
Companies based in Buckinghamshire
Business services companies established in 1961
1961 establishments in England
Companies listed on the Alternative Investment Market